Five Star Bank is an American commercial bank.  It was founded in the 1850s in Warsaw, New York as Wyoming County Bank by Wolcott J. Humphrey.

Five Star Bank is the reformation of Wyoming County Bank under Financial Institutions, Inc, along with The National Bank of Geneva, First Tier Bank & Trust, Bath National Bank, and Pavilion State Bank. Five Star Bank bought  4 HSBC branches and four First Niagara Branches in 2012. In 2016 Five Star Bank moved its regional headquarters to Five Star Bank Plaza in Rochester, formerly one HSBC plaza.

References

External links 

 Official site

Banks based in New York (state)